Lucía Sosa Vázquez (born September 12, 1978, in Michoacán) is a paralympic athlete from Mexico competing mainly in category T52 sprint events.

Lucia competed in the 2004 Summer Paralympics in the 200m and winning a silver medal in the 400m.

References

Living people
1978 births
Paralympic athletes of Mexico
Athletes (track and field) at the 2004 Summer Paralympics
Paralympic silver medalists for Mexico
Mexican female sprinters
Medalists at the 2004 Summer Paralympics
Sportspeople from Michoacán
Paralympic medalists in athletics (track and field)